South Korea competed at the 2008 Summer Paralympics in Beijing, China. The country's delegation consisted of 79 competitors and 54 officials. 

Among the competitors were world record holders Park Jong-chul in powerlifting, Min Byeong-eon in swimming and Hong Suk-man in athletics. The team's athletics (track and field) director was Yu Hee-sang. Other members of the team included wheelchair racers Hong Duk-ho and Yoo Byung-hoon. The group left for Beijing on September 1, five days before the start of the games.

Medallists

Sports

Archery

Men

|-
|align=left|Go Sung Kil
|rowspan=3 align=left|Men's individual compound open
|680
|4
|Bye
|L 112-113
|colspan=4|did not advance
|-
|align=left|Kweon Hyun Ju
|662
|17
|L 106-106*
|colspan=5|did not advance
|-
|align=left|Lee Ouk Soo
|686
|2
|Bye
|L 112-115
|colspan=4|did not advance
|-
|align=left|An Seong Pyo
|align=left|Men's individual compound W1
|619
|6
|
|W 104-100
|L 104-106
|colspan=3|did not advance
|-
|align=left|An Tae Sung
|rowspan=3 align=left|Men's individual recurce standing
|580
|17
|W 96-95
|L 98-101
|colspan=4|did not advance
|-
|align=left|Cho Hyun Kwan
|625
|4
|Bye
|L 96-101
|colspan=4|did not advance
|-
|align=left|Yoon Young Bae
|594
|15
|L 91-102
|colspan=5|did not advance
|-
|align=left|Jung Young Joo
|rowspan=3 align=left|Men's individual recurve W1/W2
|616
|9
|W 102-88
|W 106-94
|L 102-103
|colspan=3|did not advance
|-
|align=left|Kim Hong Kyu
|632
|2
|Bye
|L 99-104
|colspan=4|did not advance
|-
|align=left|Lee Hong Gu
|629
|3
|W 105-80
|W 108-103
|L 104-105
|colspan=3|did not advance
|-
|align=left|Cho Hyun Kwan Kim Hong Kyu Lee Hong Gu
|align=left|Men's team recurve
|1886 WR
|1
|
|Bye
|W 188-187
|W 201-188
|W 209-206
|
|}

* - Kweon Hyun Ju's round of 32 match against Eric Bennett was decided by additional arrows: Kweon won 9, 8 while Bennett scored 9, 9. Bennett succeeded through to the next round.

Women

|-
|align=left|Kim Ki Hee
|rowspan=3 align=left|Women's individual recurve standing
|567
|5
|Bye
|W 85-79
|L 85-86
|colspan=3|did not advance
|-
|align=left|Kim Ran Sook
|564
|6
|Bye
|L 85-98
|colspan=4|did not advance
|-
|align=left|Lee Hwa Sook
|614 WR
|1
|Bye
|W 101-97
|W 107-96
|W 101-100
|W 103-92
|
|-
|align=left|Kim Ki Hee Kim Ran Sook Lee Hwa Sook
|align=left|Women's team recurve
|1745
|2
|colspan=2 
|W 178-161
|W 199-184
|L 177-205
|
|}

Athletics

Men's track

Men's field

Women's track

Boccia

Cycling

Men's road

Men's track

Football 5-a-side

The men's football team didn't win any medals; they were 6th out 6 teams.

Players
Hur Suk
Ji Jun Min
Jo Woo Hyung
Kim Jae Sik
Kim Jung Hoon
Kim Kyung Ho
Lee Jin Won
Oh Yong Kyun
Park Meong Su
Yoon Jong Suk

Tournament

5th-6th classification

Judo

Men

Powerlifting

Men

Women

Rowing

Shooting

Men

Women

Swimming

Men

Women

Table tennis

Men

Women

Teams

Wheelchair fencing

Men

Wheelchair tennis

Men

Women

References

Nations at the 2008 Summer Paralympics
2008
Paralympics